Petru Efros (born 23 October 1964 in Drăsliceni) is a Moldovan football manager, sports administrator, FIFA players' agent and former footballer.

Biography 
Petru Efros began to practice football at the age of 10, being a disciple of Efim Popandopulo. He graduated from Republican Football School, and launched himself in the professional football.

At the age of 19 Efros came to Zimbru Chișinău, then-named Nistru Chișinău. After a year spent at Zimbru, Efros goes in Ukraine (then Ukrainian SSR) where he played for other clubs. He has returned to Moldova in 1988 and began his activity as player-manager for Izvoraș Drăsliceni and Constructorul Chișinău, then he retired as player.

In the spring of 1990 Efros has founded the football club Agro Chișinău as Constructorul Chișinău, being its president until 1999. Between 1990 and 2003 Efros has worked as the manager of Agro Chișinău, Zimbru, FC Edineț, and selectioner of Moldova national futsal team, and also Moldova under-17 football team. In 2004 he became officially a FIFA players' agent. In 2007-2008 he was the manager of Beșiktaș Chișinău.

Petru Efros is married and has a son, Cristian "Efrosinho" Efros, who is a football manager and former footballer as well.

References

External links 
 Biography of Petru Efros
 

1964 births
Living people
Soviet footballers
Moldovan footballers
Moldovan football managers
FC Zimbru Chișinău managers
FC Zimbru Chișinău players
Association football midfielders